Placement Group B of the 1998 Fed Cup Asia/Oceania Zone Group I was one of six pools in the Americas Zone Group I of the 1998 Fed Cup. The three teams that placed first in the initial pools competed in a round robin competition, with the top team advancing to the World Group II Play-offs.

Thailand vs. Indonesia

China vs. Indonesia

China vs. Thailand

See also
Fed Cup structure

References

External links
 Fed Cup website

1998 Fed Cup Asia/Oceania Zone